Caltowie is a town in the Mid North region of South Australia. It is on the Wilkins Highway and the Crystal Brook-Broken Hill railway line between Gladstone and Jamestown.

History
Caltowie was first known to European settlers as 'Carcowie' (meaning lizard's water hole), and became a popular stop for teamsters where they crossed the Yackamoorundie Creek.

The Government Town of Caltowie was surveyed in 1871 at the centre of the Hundred of Caltowie a few months after the hundred had been proclaimed.

References

Towns in South Australia
Mid North (South Australia)